Punta Xicalango is a geographical feature in Campeche, Mexico. It is a sandy protrusion from the mainland of Yucatán Peninsula into the Gulf of Mexico, and it marks the point where the peninsula's coastline changes direction. It is located 5 km to the northeast of Punta Zacatal, above the western channel that connects the Laguna de Términos with the Gulf of Mexico and faces Carmen Island.

History
This point is considered the western boundary of the territory that historically corresponded to the Maya civilization; that is, it would have been the border with other Pre-Columbian Mesoamerican peoples.   It was, according to some sources, an important site of exchange and place of settlement of the Putún or Chontal Maya.

Transportation
Before the construction of Zacatal Bridge in 1994, ferries connecting Carmen Island with the continent docked at Punta Xicalango.

References

Peninsulas of Mexico
Landforms of Campeche
Gulf Coast of Mexico